"Tears of the Lonely" is a song written by Wayland Holyfield, and originally recorded by Don Williams on his 1978 album Expressions.  The song was later recorded by American country music artist Mickey Gilley and released in February 1982 as the third single from his album You Don't Know Me.  The song reached #3 on the Billboard Hot Country Singles chart and #1 on the RPM Country Tracks chart in Canada.

Charts

Weekly charts

Year-end charts

References

Songs about loneliness
1982 singles
1978 songs
Don Williams songs
Mickey Gilley songs
Songs written by Wayland Holyfield
Song recordings produced by Jim Ed Norman
Epic Records singles